D-Orbit is a private aerospace company headquartered in Italy with subsidiaries in Portugal, the UK and the US.

D-orbit is mainly active in the Space tug also known as orbital transfer vehicle (OTV) market. While this concept has existed for several decades, it is only in the last few years that more examples are being produced and used.

D-Orbit has been operating commercial ION missions since September 2020, deploying satellites for customers like Planet Labs, EnduroSat, Elecnor Deimos, University of Southern California, SatRevolution, and Kleos, and operating payloads for the German HPS, High Performance Space Structure Systems, the Instituto de Astrofísica de Canarias (IAC), and the Swiss data security company Cysec SA.

History 

D-Orbit was founded in 2011 by Luca Rossettini, currently serving as chief executive officer (CEO), and Renato Panesi, currently serving as chief commercial officer (COO).

The company's initial focus was the development of a smart and autonomous decommissioning motor for satellites and launcher stages called D3 (D-Orbit Decommissioning Device). In 2015, the D3 project was partially funded by the European Union under the framework of Horizon 2020.

This provided the origin of the D-orbit name, being just a contraction of the term "de-orbit", which denotes an orbital manoeuver that pulls a spacecraft out of its operational orbit and inserts it into a reentry trajectory that will eventually cause it to burn up upon atmospheric entry.

In 2017, the company began the development of ION Satellite Carrier, an orbital transfer vehicle able to host a batch of satellites, transport them across orbits, and release each one of them, individually, into a custom orbital slot and operate third-party payloads.
The OTV performed its first commercial mission in September 2020.

In 2022, the company planned to go public via a SPAC with a valuation of $1.4bn, however this was cancelled.

In June 2022, the company gained an award of around 1.95 million Euros from the European Space Agency though a 'Boost! award'.

Products and space launches

The initial plan was to create a product to deorbit satellites at the end of their life. However the company has moved on to space tugs also known as 'orbital transfer vehicles' (OTV). D-orbit developed the ION Satellite Carrier formerly known as 'ION CubeSat Carrier'. The company aims to address the space logistics needs of customers by reducing the time needed to transfer a single spacecraft or a batch of satellites belonging to a constellation from a parking orbit to their designated operational slot. The company's core solution is D-Orbit's proprietary launch and deployment orbital transfer vehicle (OTV) ION Satellite Carrier to perform last-mile delivery of the customer's satellites. D-Orbit's OTV is also able to perform in-orbit demonstration (IOD) of third-party payloads hosted onboard thanks to a plug-and-play mechanical, electrical, and data interface that streamlines integration and in-orbit operations.

Main product: ION Satellite Carrier 
ION Satellite Carrier is a satellite platform with a configurable payload bay that can be equipped with a combination of proprietary or third-party launch dispensers,  third-party payloads, microsatellites,  and instruments like lenses and antennas to be tested in orbit.

Through the course of a mission, ION Satellite Carrier can travel across orbits characterized by different orientation, altitude, and local time of ascending node (LTAN), deploy the satellites on board into custom, individual orbital slots and perform experiments on hosted payloads in the designated operating envelope.

Launches

The first mission was launched in September 2020 with the successful deployment of 12 SuperDove satellites for Earth-imaging company Planet Labs.

In January 2021, D-Orbit launched a second ION mission, Pulse, which successfully deployed 20 satellites after performing a 10km orbit raise and demonstrated the ability to change the local time of the ascending node (LTAN).

During its third mission, launched in June 2021, the company deployed six satellites and demonstrated 12 hosted payloads, including D-Orbit's proprietary in-orbit cloud computing platform and data storage service built in collaboration with Swedish-based AI company Unibap, which performed 23 SpaceCloud compatible applications.

The fourth mission, Dashing Through the Stars, launched in January 2022, deployed six satellites and tested several in-space cloud applications on an upgraded version of its in-orbit cloud platform.

The fifth mission, Spacelust, launched on 1 April 2022, deployed 4 satellites for Kleos Space, 3 satellites for the University of Chile and one for Upmosphere.

The sixth mission, Infinite Blue launched on 25 May 2022, deployed Guardian for Aistech Space and SBUDNIC for Brown University. There were also hosted payloads from Cryptosat and Genergo for in-orbit demonstration. 

Two of D-Orbit's space tug's were launched on SpaceX's Transporter-6 mission on 3 January 2023, to release nine satellites: four cubesats for a data relay and asset tracking constellation owned by the Swiss company Astrocast, two for Futura which includes NPS Spacemind, Kelpie, a 9-pound (4-kilogram) CubeSat to provide maritime tracking services for Orbcomm, Sharjah Sat 1 for Sharjah Academy for Astronomy, and TauSat 2 for Tel Aviv University. There are also third-party hosted payloads by the Instituto de Astrofisica de Canarias, Genergo, Cryptosat and an undisclosed customer's hosted payload.

As of January 2023, the company has launched eight commercial orbital transportation missions and brought over 85 payloads to space.

References

External links 
Official website

Space
Space tugs
Private spaceflight companies
Aerospace companies of Italy